When Colts Ran is a 2010 novel by Australian novelist Roger McDonald.

Plot summary

The "Colts" of the title is the principal character, Kingsley Colts, an orphan being raised by World War I veteran Dunc Buckler and his wife Veronica. The novel follows the arc of Colts's life, from station hand to World War II in New Guinea to livestock agent, broken, forlorn and alcoholic.

Notes

Epigraph:

Peaseblossom.........Ready.
Cobweb.......................... And I.
Moth ......................................And I
Mustardseed....................................And I.
All..........................................................Where shall we go?

- A Midsummer Night's Dream, Act III, Scene I

Reviews
 The Sydney Morning Herald
 ANZ LitLovers LitBlog

Awards and nominations

 2011 shortlisted Indie Awards — Fiction
 2011 shortlisted Miles Franklin Literary Award
 2011 shortlisted Prime Minister's Literary Awards — Fiction
 2011 shortlisted Victorian Premier's Literary Awards — The Vance Palmer Prize for Fiction
 2012 longlisted International Dublin Literary Award

References 

2010 Australian novels